Ayrshire is a historic county and registration county in south-west Scotland, located on the shores of the Firth of Clyde. Its principal towns include Ayr, Kilmarnock and Irvine and it borders the counties of Renfrewshire and Lanarkshire to the north-east, Dumfriesshire to the south-east, and Kirkcudbrightshire and Wigtownshire to the south. Like many other counties of Scotland it currently has no administrative function, instead being sub-divided into the council areas of East Ayrshire, North Ayrshire and South Ayrshire. It has a population of approximately 366,800.

The electoral and valuation area named Ayrshire covers the three council areas of East Ayrshire, North Ayrshire and South Ayrshire, therefore covering the whole historic county of Ayrshire but also including the Isle of Arran, Great Cumbrae and Little Cumbrae from the historic county of Buteshire. The three council areas together also form the Ayrshire and Arran lieutenancy area.

The largest settlement in Ayrshire by population is Kilmarnock, closely followed by Ayr, the county town.

Geography
Ayrshire is roughly crescent-shaped and is a predominantly flat county with areas of low hills; it forms part of the Southern Uplands geographic region of Scotland. The north of the county contains the main towns and bulk of the population. East of Largs can be found the Renfrewshire Heights, which continue south to the hill-country around Blae Loch.

Southern Ayrshire shares with the Galloway counties some rugged hill country known as the Galloway Hills. These hills lie to the west of the A713 (Ayr to Castle Douglas road) and they run south from the Loch Doon area almost to the Solway Firth. To the east of this route through the hills lie the Carsphairn and Scaur Hills which lie to the south east of Dalmellington and south of New Cumnock. Glen Afton runs deep into these hills.

Ayrshire is one of the most agriculturally fertile regions of Scotland. Potatoes are grown in fields near the coast, using seaweed-based fertiliser, and in addition the region produces pork products, other root vegetables, and cattle (see below); and summer berries such as strawberries are grown abundantly.

A number of small islands in the Firth of Clyde are part of Ayrshire, the chief of these being Horse Isle, Lady Isle and Ailsa Craig.

Rivers
The main rivers flowing to the Clyde coast are, from north to south, the following:

River Garnock
River Irvine
River Ayr
River Doon
River Girvan
River Stinchar

History
The area that today forms Ayrshire was part of the area south of the Antonine Wall which was briefly occupied by the Romans during the reign of Emperor Antoninus Pius (see: Roman Britain#Occupation and retreat from southern Scotland). It was inhabited by the Damnonii, who are presumed to have been Britons. Later, it formed part of the British Kingdom of Strathclyde, which was incorporated into the Kingdom of Scotland during the 11th century. In 1263, the Scots successfully drove off the Norwegian leidang-army in a skirmish known as the Battle of Largs.

A notable historic building in Ayrshire is Turnberry Castle, which dates from the 13th century or earlier, and which may have been the birthplace of Robert the Bruce.

The historic shire or sheriffdom of Ayr was divided into three districts or bailieries which later made up the county of Ayrshire. The three districts were:
Carrick in the south. It was situated between the Doon and the wild district of Galloway in the adjoining Stewartries, an area that was little else than a vast tract of hills and mosses.
Kyle in the centre, which included the royal burgh of Ayr, occupied the central district between the River Irvine in the north, and the River Doon in the south and south-west, an area that is quite hilly inland. It was subdivided into "Kyle Stewart", (sometimes called "Stewart Kyle" or "Walter's Kyle") and "King's Kyle," the former embracing the country between the Irvine and the River Ayr; and the latter, the triangular portion between the Ayr and the Doon, which is honoured as the birthplace and youthful home of Robert Burns.
Cunninghame in the north which included the royal burgh of Irvine was that part of the county which lay north of the Irvine water, and was in an area that is generally level and fertile.

The area used to be heavily industrialised, with steel making, coal mining and in Kilmarnock numerous examples of production-line manufacturing, most famously Johnnie Walker whisky. In more recent history, Digital Equipment had a large manufacturing plant near Ayr from about 1976 until the company was taken over by Compaq in 1998. Some supplier companies grew up to service this site and the more distant IBM plant at Greenock in Renfrewshire. Scotland's aviation industry has long been based in and around Prestwick and its international airport, and although aircraft manufacture ceased at the former British Aerospace plant in 1998, a significant number of aviation companies are still based on the Prestwick site. However, unemployment in the region (excluding the more rural South Ayrshire) is above the national average.

Throughout the 17th century, huge numbers of people from Ayrshire moved to Ulster, the northern province in Ireland, as part of the Plantation of Ulster, many of them with surnames such as Burns, Hamilton, Morrow, Stewart, Flanagan, Kennedy and Cunningham. Today, the Ulster Scots dialect is largely an offshoot of the version of Lowland Scots spoken in Ayrshire. The Ulster Scots dialect is still widely spoken throughout County Antrim and in parts of County Down and County Londonderry, as well as still being widely spoken in West Tír Eoghain and parts of County Donegal (chiefly East Donegal and Inishowen).

Local government

Commissioners of Supply were created in 1667 for each shire, and formed the main administrative body for the area until county councils were created in 1890 under the Local Government (Scotland) Act 1889. The 1889 act also led to a review of boundaries of many of Scotland's counties; in the case of Ayrshire the two parishes of Beith and Dunlop, which had both straddled Ayrshire and Renfrewshire, were brought entirely within Ayrshire. The burghs of Ayr and Kilmarnock were both excluded from the area controlled by the county council when it was created in 1890, being deemed capable of running their own services.

In 1930 the Local Government (Scotland) Act 1929 was implemented. This brought Ayr and Kilmarnock under the control of the county council, and re-designated all burghs as either large burghs or small burghs. Ayr and Kilmarnock were both classed as large burghs, allowing them to retain control of many functions, whilst the county's other burghs were all classed as small burghs, ceding many functions to the county council. The 1929 act also abolished the parish councils. In Ayrshire in excess of 30 parishes were consolidated into ten district councils. The District Councils were Ayr, Cumnock, Dalmellington, Girvan, Irvine, Kilbirnie, Kilmarnock, Maybole, Troon and Saltcoats. Ayrshire County Council was based at County Buildings in Wellington Square in Ayr.

In May 1975 the county council was abolished and its functions were transferred to Strathclyde Regional Council. The county area was divided between four new districts within the two-tier Strathclyde region: Cumnock and Doon Valley, Cunninghame, Kilmarnock and Loudoun and Kyle and Carrick. The Cunninghame district included the Isle of Arran, Great Cumbrae and Little Cumbrae, which had until then been administered as part of the County of Bute. For lieutenancy purposes, the last lord-lieutenant of the county of Ayrshire was made lord-lieutenant for the combined area of the four districts when the reforms came into effect in 1975, with the lieutenancy area being renamed Ayrshire and Arran in 1996.

In 1996 the two-tier system of regions and districts was abolished and Ayrshire was divided between the unitary council areas of East Ayrshire (covering the area of the former Kilmarnock & Loudoun District and Cumnock & Doon Valley District), North Ayrshire (covering the area of the former Cunninghame District Council) and South Ayrshire (covering the area of the former Kyle and Carrick District).

The boundaries of the historic county of Ayrshire are still used for some limited official purposes connected with land registration, being a registration county.

Parliamentary constituencies 
There was an Ayrshire constituency of the House of Commons of the Parliament of Great Britain from 1708 to 1801 and of the Parliament of the United Kingdom from 1801 until 1868, when the constituency was divided into Ayrshire North and  Ayrshire South.

During the whole of the 1708 to 1868 period, and until 1950, the burghs of Ayr and Irvine were parliamentary burghs, represented as components of Ayr Burghs. In 1832 Kilmarnock became a parliamentary burgh, to be represented as a component of Kilmarnock Burghs until 1918. Ayr Burghs and Kilmarnock Burghs were districts of burghs, and quite different in character from later Ayr and Kilmarnock constituencies.

From 1918 to 1983 Ayrshire and Buteshire were treated as if a single area for purposes of parliamentary representation, with their combined area being divided into different constituencies at different times. Scottish local government counties were abolished in 1975, in favour of regions and districts, but the next reform of constituency boundaries was not until 1983.

Constituencies covering Ayrshire may be listed by periods as below, but the story is somewhat more complicated than the lists may imply: until 1918, Ayr Burghs and Kilmarnock Burghs included burghs lying outside both Ayrshire and Buteshire; a particular constituency name may represent different boundaries in different periods; in 1974, there were boundary changes without the creation of any new constituency names.

Transport

A number of railway lines connect the towns of northern Ayrshire to each other and also to Glasgow, as well as south to Stranraer and south-east to Dumfries.

Ferries link Ayrshire to the islands of Arran and Great Cumbrae in Buteshire.

The name Glasgow was added in front of Prestwick as per American military airport naming conventions, as the airport was in the past oft-used as a stopover by US military personnel on their way to and from military bases in Germany. Moreover, it is known in rock history as the only place in Britain visited by Elvis Presley, on his way home from army service in Germany in 1960.

Towns and villages in Ayrshire

Alloway
Ardrossan
Annbank
Ardeer
Auchentiber
Auchinleck
Ayr
Ballantrae
Barassie
Barkip
Barr
Barrhill
Barrmill
Beith
Bellsbank
Belmont
Benslie
Bourtreehill
Broomlands
Burnhouse
Catrine
Colmonell
Coylton
Craigie
Craigmalloch
Cronberry
Crosshill
Crosshouse
Cumnock
Cunninghamhead
Dailly
Dalgarven
Dalmellington
Dalry
Dalrymple
Darvel
Doonfoot
Drakemyre
Dreghorn
Drongan
Drybridge
Dundonald
Dunlop
Dunure
Fairlie
Fenwick
Fergushill
Fullarton
Galston
Gatehead
Gateside
Giffordland
Girdle Toll
Girvan
Glenbuck
Glengarnock
Greenhills
Hansel
Haugh
Heathfield
Hessilhead hamlet
Highfield
Hurlford
Irvine
Joppa
Kilbirnie
Kilmarnock
Kilmaurs
Kilwinning
Kincaidston
Kirkmichael
Kirkoswald
Knockentiber
Largs
Lendalfoot
Loans
Logan
Longbar
Lugton
Lugar
Lylestone
Mauchline
Maidens
Maybole
Meikle Auchengree
Minishant
Monkton
Moscow
Montgreenan
Mossblown
Muirkirk
Netherthird
New Cumnock
Newmilns
Ochiltree
Old Dailly
Patna
Pinmore
Pinwherry
Polnessan
Portencross
Prestwick
Priestland
Rankinston
Riccarton
Saltcoats
Seafield
Seamill
Skelmorlie
Sorn
Springside
Stair
Stevenston
Stewarton
Straiton
Symington
Tarbolton
Torranyard
Trabboch
Troon
Turnberry
Waterside
West Kilbride

Places of interest 

Auchenharvie Castle
Barony and Castle of Giffen
Cleeves Cove
Clyde Muirshiel Regional Park
Corsehill
Culzean Castle
Dalgarven Mill – Museum of Ayrshire Country Life and Costume
Dean Castle - Kilmarnock
Eglinton Country Park
Laigh Milton viaduct
Thurgartstone
Ayr Seafront Playpark
Burns National Heritage Park
The Low Green, Ayr
Turnberry (golf course)

People from Ayrshire

 Hew Ainslie (1792–1878), poet
 Nicola Benedetti (1987-), classical violinist born in West Kilbride
 Sir Thomas Brisbane (1773–1860), Soldier and Colonial Administrator, after whom the city of Brisbane is named. Born in Largs.
 Kris Boyd (1983-), Footballer, born in Irvine
 John Boyd Orr (1880–1971), Nobel Peace Prize winner, born in Kilmaurs.  
 Kirk Broadfoot (1984–), Footballer, born in Irvine
 George Douglas Brown (1869–1902), novelist, best known for The House with the Green Shutters, born in Ochiltree
 Robert the Bruce (1274–1329), possibly born in Turnberry Castle
 Craig Burley (1971–), Footballer, born in Ayr
 George Burley (1956–), Footballer, born in Cumnock
 Robert Burns (1759–1796), poet, born in Alloway;
 Paul Caddis (1988–), Footballer, born in Irvine
 Eric Caldow (1934–2019), Footballer, born in Cumnock
 Kenneth Campbell (1917–1941), RAF pilot and posthumous recipient of the Victoria Cross, born in Ardrossan
 James McCosh Clark (1833–1898), mayor of Auckland, born in Beith
 Steve Clarke (1963-), Football manager and former player, born in Saltcoats.
 Paul Clarke (1956–), Footballer, born in Ardrossan
 Craig Conway (1985–), Footballer, born in Irvine
 Robert Craufurd (1764–1812), British major general;
 Noam Dar (1993-), professional wrestler signed to WWE performing on the NXT UK and 205 Live brands
 Billy Dodds (1969–), Footballer, born in New Cumnock
 Kris Doolan (1986–), Footballer, born in Irvine
 John Dunlop (1840–1921), inventor of the pneumatic tyre, born in Dreghorn
 Robert Dunsmuir (1825-1889), coal baron and industrial capitalist on Vancouver Island, Canada
 Henry Faulds (1843-1930), doctor, missionary and scientist. Born in Beith
 Andrew Fisher (1862–1928), 5th Prime Minister of Australia (1908-1909, 1910–1913 and 1914–1915)
 Sir Alexander Fleming (1881–1955), inventor/discoverer of penicillin, born in Darvel
 Alan Forrest (1996–), Footballer, born in Irvine
 James Forrest (1991–), Footballer, born in Prestwick
 John Galt (1779–1839), author
 Drew Galloway (1985–), professional wrestler on WWE's RAW brand as Drew McIntyre
 Billy Gilmour (2001–), Footballer, born in Irvine
 Jamie Hamill (1986–), Footballer, born in Irvine
 Colin Hay (1953-), singer and former lead-singer of Australian band Men At Work, born in Saltcoats.
 Garry Hay (1977–), Footballer, born in Irvine
 Jack Hendry (1995–), Footballer, grew up in Annbank
 Gary Holt (1973–), Football manager and former player, born in Irvine
 Air Chief Marshal Angus Houston (1947–), current Australian Chief of Defence Force
 George Houston (1869–1947), landscape painter of Scottish locales, born in Dalry.
 Tom Hunter (1961–), entrepreneur and philanthropist
 Bobby Lennox, MBE. (1943-), Footballer, born in Saltcoats
 Lou Macari (1949–), Footballer, grew up in Largs
 The MacDonald Brothers, recording artists and contestants on The X Factor
 Sir James MacMillan (1959-), classical composer and conductor
 John McAdam (1756–1836), engineer and inventor of macadam
 James McCosh (1811–1894), philosopher of the Scottish School of Common Sense and president of what would become Princeton University
 Robby McCrorie (1998–), Footballer, born in Dailly
 Ross McCrorie (1998–), Footballer, born in Dailly
 Jai McDowall (1986–), winner of Britain's Got Talent in 2011
 Hugh McIlvanney MBE (1934-2019), Sports Journalist, born in Kilmarnock. 
 William McIlvanney (1936–2015), Writer, born in Kilmarnock.
 Alan McInally (1963–), Footballer, born in Ayr
 Rory McKenzie (1993–), Footballer, born in Irvine
 Sir Thomas McKillop, (1943–) CEO of AstraZeneca, born in Dreghorn
 James Henry McLean (1806–1886), physician and United States Congressman from Missouri
 Gordon McQueen (1952–), Footballer, born in Kilbirnie
 Colin Mochrie (1957–), improvisational comedian and actor best known for being in Whose Line Is It Anyway?, born in Kilmarnock
 William Murdoch (1754–1839), inventor of gas lighting and engineer
 Steven Naismith (1986–), Footballer, born in Irvine
 Simon Neil (1979–), James Johnston (1980–), and Ben Johnston (1980–) of Biffy Clyro
 Jamie Ness (1991–), Footballer, born in Irvine
 Steve Nicol (1961–), Footballer, born in Irvine
 Alexander Peden (1626–1686), leading figure in the Covenanter movement
 Craig Samson (1984–), Footballer, born in Irvine
 Bill Shankly (1913–1981), football manager, born in Glenbuck
 Bob Shankly (1910-1982) Football Manager, born in Glenbuck
 Robert Simson (1687–1768), mathematician and professor of mathematics for 50 years
 Ryan Stevenson (1984–), Football manager and former player, born in Irvine
 Ross Stewart (1996–), Footballer, born in Irvine
 Gordon Smith (1954–), Footballer, born in Kilwinning
 Nicola Sturgeon (1970–), current First Minister of Scotland, born in Irvine.
 Sam Torrance (1953–), professional golfer, born in Largs
 Kimberly Benson (1991–), professional wrestler best known as Piper Niven and for her work in WWE and ICW

See also
 Potato Labour Scandal 1971

References

External links 

 South Ayrshire Council
 Ayrshire & Arran Tourist Board
 Place-Names of the Coalfield Communities

 
Counties of Scotland
Counties of the United Kingdom (1801–1922)